The Holiday Farm Fire occurred in the U.S. state of Oregon in 2020. It ranks among the largest wildfires in Oregon history, burning a total of  centered on the McKenzie River valley in Lane County.

Beginning near the Holiday Farm RV Resort in Rainbow on the evening of September 7, 2020, possibly due to fallen power lines, the fire spread rapidly down the McKenzie valley and up into the densely wooded foothills on both sides of the river and Oregon Route 126. Many people evacuated to Springfield. Most structures in the community of Blue River were destroyed, as were numerous properties in nearby communities.

See also
2020 Oregon wildfires
Santiam Fire

References

External links

 Holiday Farm Fire Story & Data at United States Department of Agriculture

2020 Oregon wildfires